Chysis bractescens is a species of orchid. It is native to Oaxaca, Tabasco, Guatemala, Belize, El Salvador, Honduras, and Nicaragua.

References

  (1840) Edwards's Botanical Register 26: misc. 61.
  (2006) Epidendroideae (Part One). Genera Orchidacearum 4: 173 ff. Oxford University Press.
  (2010) Conspectus neotropicus mesoamericanus. Le genre Chysis Lindley (Orchidaceae). Richardiana 10: 161–192.

External links 

bractescens
Epiphytic orchids
Orchids of Mexico
Orchids of Central America
Orchids of Belize
Plants described in 1840